A banner (as "khoshun" in Mongolian) is an administrative division of the Inner Mongolia Autonomous Region in China, equivalent to a county-level administrative division.

Banners were first used during the Qing dynasty, which organized the Mongols into banners except those who belonged to the Eight Banners. Each banner had sums as nominal subdivisions. In Inner Mongolia, several banners made up a league. In the rest, including Outer Mongolia, northern Xinjiang and Qinghai, Aimag (Аймаг) was the largest administrative division. While it restricted the Mongols from crossing banner borders, the dynasty protected Mongolia from population pressure from China proper. After the Mongolian People's Revolution, the banners of Outer Mongolia were abolished in 1923.

There were 49 banners and 24 tribes in Inner Mongolia during the Republic of China.

Today, banners are a county-level division in the Chinese administrative hierarchy. There are 52 banners in total, include 3 autonomous banners.

Banners

The following list of 49 individual Banners is sorted alphabetically according to the banner's specific title (i.e. ignoring adjectives such as New, Old, Left, Right, and so on).

Abag Banner; League: Xilingol
Alxa Right Banner; League: Alxa
Alxa Left Banner; League: Alxa
Aohan Banner
Ar Horqin Banner
Arun Banner
Bairin Left Banner
Bairin Right Banner
Old Barag Banner 
New Barag Left Banner 
New Barag Right Banner
Chahar Right Middle Banner 
Chahar Right Front Banner 
Chahar Right Rear Banner 
Dalad Banner
Darhan Muminggan United Banner
Ejin Banner; League: Alxa
Ejin Horo Banner 
Hanggin Banner
Hanggin Rear Banner
Harqin Banner
Hexigten Banner 
Horqin Left Rear Banner 
Horqin Left Middle Banner 
Horqin Right Front Banner; League: Hinggan
Horqin Right Middle Banner; League: Hinggan
Hure Banner
Jalaid Banner; League: Hinggan
Jarud Banner
Jungar Banner
Muminggan Banner -> Darhan Muminggan United Banner
Naiman Banner 
Ongniud Banner
Otog Banner 
Otog Front Banner
Siziwang Banner
Sonid Left Banner; League: Xilingol
Sonid Right Banner; League: Xilingol
Taibus Banner; League: Xilingol
Tumed Left Banner
Tumed Right Banner
East Ujimqin Banner; League: Xilingol
West Ujimqin Banner; League: Xilingol
Urad Rear Banner
Urad Middle Banner
Urad Front Banner
Uxin Banner 
Xianghuang Banner; League: Xilingol
Zhenglan Banner; League: Xilingol
Zhengxiangbai Banner; League: Xilingol

Autonomous banner
An autonomous banner is a special type of banner set up by the People's Republic of China. There are 3 autonomous banners, all of which are found in northeastern Inner Mongolia, each with a designated ethnic majority other than Han or Mongol and which is a national ethnic minority:

Oroqen Autonomous Banner (鄂伦春自治旗) for the Oroqen
Evenki Autonomous Banner (鄂温克族自治旗) for the Evenks
Morin Dawa Daur Autonomous Banner (莫力达瓦达斡尔族自治旗) for the Daur

Banner converted city/county
Dorbod Mongol Autonomous County (Dorbod Banner)
Ergun (Ergun Right Banner)
Genhe (Ergun Left Banner)
Harqin Left Wing Mongol Autonomous County (Harqin Left Banner)
Front Gorlos Mongol Autonomous County (Front Gorlos Banner)
Xilinhot (Abahanar Banner)
Yakeshi (Xuguit Banner)
Zhalantun (Butha Banner)
Zhaoyuan County (Rear Gorlos Banner)

See also
Eight Banners (banner system of the Manchus)

References

 
Autonomous administrative divisions of China
Geography of Inner Mongolia
County-level divisions of the People's Republic of China
Articles containing Mongolian script text